Alakurtti may refer to:
Alakurtti (air base), a naval air base in Murmansk Oblast, Russia
Alakurtti (rural locality), a rural locality (a selo) in Murmansk Oblast, Russia